Now Kariz (also Romanized as Now Kārīz;) means the new Qanat, is a village in Rivand Rural District, in the Central District of Nishapur County, Razavi Khorasan Province, Iran. At the 2006 census, its population was 3.

References 

Populated places in Nishapur County